Inetkaes was an ancient Egyptian princess of the Third Dynasty, who reigned during the Old Kingdom.

Inetkaes was the only known child of Pharaoh Djoser and Queen Hetephernebti, and she was a granddaughter of Khasekhemwy and Nimaethap.

She is mentioned on the boundary stelae surrounding Djoser's step pyramid (these are now to be found in various museums) and is depicted on a relief found in Heliopolis (now in Torino). This shows the enthroned pharaoh accompanied by smaller figures of Inetkaes and Hetephernebti.

Sources

Princesses of the Third Dynasty of Egypt
27th-century BC women
Djoser